The Central Fighter Establishment was a Royal Air Force formation that dealt with the development of fighter aircraft tactics which was formed on 4 September 1944 at RAF Wittering. It also tested new fighter aircraft and equipment, and with the training of squadron and flight commanders. It was formed on 1 October 1944 as part of No. 12 Group RAF, and was disbanded on 1 February 1966 while at RAF Binbrook.

Units

 Air Fighting Development Squadron (1944-66) became Fighter Command Trials Unit
 All-Weather Development Squadron (1956-59)

 All-Weather Fighter Leaders School (1950-58) became All-Weather Fighter Combat School
 All-Weather Wing (1950-56) became All-Weather Development Squadron
 Day Fighter Development Wing (1944-??)
 Day Fighter Leaders School (1944-58) became Day Fighter Combat Squadron
 Enemy Aircraft Flight (1945)
 Fighter Combat School (1958-??)
 Day Fighter Combat Squadron (1958-65)
 All-Weather Fighter Combat School (1958-62) became Javelin Operational Conversion Squadron
 Fighter Command Instrument Rating Flight (1956-60) became Fighter Command Instrument Rating Squadron
 Fighter Command Instrument Rating Squadron (1960-63) became No. 226 Operational Conversion Unit RAF
 Fighter Command Instrument Training Flight (1948-51) became Fighter Command Instrument Training Squadron
 Fighter Command Instrument Training Squadron (1951-56) became Fighter Command Instrument Rating Flight
 Fighter Command Target Facilities Squadron (1961-63) became No. 85 Squadron RAF
 Fighter Experimental Flight (1944-46)
 Fighter Interception Development Squadron (1944-50) became Radar Interception Development Squadron
 Fighter Leaders School (1944-?)
 Fighter Support Development Squadron (1951-??)
 Fighter Support Development Unit (1951) became Fighter Support Development Squadron
 Fighter Weapons School (1955-1958 as part of the Central Gunnery School) (1958-)
 Javelin Operational Conversion Squadron (1962)
 Lightning Conversion Squadron (1960-63) became No. 226 Operational Conversion Unit RAF
 Naval Air Fighting Development Squadron (1945-56)
 Night All-Weather Wing (1957-??)
 Night Fighter Development Wing (1944-49) became Night Fighter Wing
 Night Fighter Leaders School (1945-50) became All-Weather Fighter Leaders School
 Night Fighter Training Squadron (1945) became Night Fighter Leaders School
 Night Fighter Wing (1949-50) became All-Weather Wing
 Radar Interception Development Squadron (1950-53)

Commandant

References

Citations

Bibliography

Air force test units and formations
Military history of Norfolk
Military units and formations of the Royal Air Force
Organisations based in Norfolk
Science and technology in Norfolk